Habropetalum is a genus of flowering plants belonging to the family Dioncophyllaceae.

Its native range is Western Tropical Africa.

Species:
 Habropetalum dawei (Hutch. & Dalziel) Airy Shaw

References

Caryophyllales
Caryophyllales genera